DeFord Bailey (December 14, 1899 – July 2, 1982) was an American country music and blues star from the 1920s until 1941. He was one of the first performers to be introduced on Nashville radio station WSM's Grand Ole Opry,  the first African-American performer to appear on the show, and the first performer to have his music recorded in Nashville. Bailey played several instruments in his career but is best known for playing the harmonica, often being referred to as a "harmonica wizard".

Born and raised in Tennessee, Bailey learned how to play the harmonica while recuperating from polio as a young child. He moved to Nashville with relatives in his late teens and was an important early contributor to Nashville's burgeoning music industry. Among the first generation of entertainers to perform live on the radio, his recorded compositions were well-known and popular.

Bailey toured and performed with many well-known country artists during the 1930s. As a result of the 1941 royalties disagreement between Broadcast Music, Inc. (BMI) and American Society of Composers, Authors and Publishers (ASCAP), he was fired by WSM and stopped making his living as an entertainer. Afterwards he supported himself and his family by shining shoes and renting out rooms in his home. He returned to sporadic public performances in 1974 when he was invited to participate in the Opry's first Old-Timers show and in 2005 was posthumously inducted into the Country Music Hall of Fame.

Early life
A grandson of slaves, Bailey was born on December 14, 1899, near the Bellwood community in Smith County, Tennessee. His mother died when he was about a year old and he was then taken in by his aunt Barbara Lou.  He learned to play the harmonica at the age of three when he contracted polio. Bailey was confined to bed for a year and could only move his head and arms. His style of playing the harmonica evolved, as he imitated the sounds of the natural world around him and of the trains traveling through the countryside. Though Bailey did recover from his bout with polio, there were some long-term consequences. His back remained slightly misshapen and he only grew to be 4 feet, 10 inches. He was so short and slender as a teenager he was mistaken to be an underage child by railroad ticket agents. His foster father Clark Odom was hired as a manager for a farm near Nashville and in 1908 the family made the move from Smith County. The Odoms and their foster son lived on Nashville and Franklin Tennessee farms Clark Odom managed for several years. In 1918, the family moved to Nashville when Clark Odom got a city job and Bailey started to perform locally there as an amateur.

Career

Bailey's first radio appearance was apparently in September 1925 on Fred Exum's WDAD, a Nashville station that only lasted from 1925 until sometime in 1927. His first documented appearances, however, were in 1926 according to The Nashville Tennessean including WDAD on January 14 and WSM on June 19. On December 10, 1927, he debuted his trademark song, "Pan American Blues" (named for the Louisville and Nashville Railroad's Pan-American), on a program then known as the WSM Barn Dance. At that time Barn Dance aired after NBC's classical music show, the Music Appreciation Hour. While introducing Bailey, WSM station manager and announcer George D. Hay exclaimed on-air, “For the past hour, we have been listening to music largely from Grand Opera, but from now on, we will present ‘The Grand Ole Opry.’” "Pan American Blues" was the first recording of a harmonica blues solo.

Several records by Bailey were issued in 1927 and 1928, all of them harmonica solos. In 1927 he recorded for Brunswick Records in New York City, In 1928 he made the first recordings in Nashville, eight sides for RCA Victor, three of which were issued on the Victor, Bluebird, and RCA labels. Emblematic of the ambiguity of Bailey's position as a recording artist is the fact that his arguably greatest recording, "John Henry", was released by RCA separately in both its "race" series and its "hillbilly" series. In addition to his well-known harmonica, Bailey also played the guitar, bones, and banjo.

Bailey was a pioneer member of the WSM Grand Ole Opry and one of its most popular performers, appearing on the program from 1927 to 1941. During this period he toured with major country stars, including Uncle Dave Macon, Bill Monroe, and Roy Acuff. Like other black stars of his day traveling in the Southern United States and Western United States, he faced difficulties in finding food and accommodations because of discriminatory Jim Crow laws.

Bailey was fired by WSM in 1941 because of a licensing conflict between BMI and ASCAP, which prevented him from playing his best-known tunes on the radio.  When he was let go from the Opry, that effectively ended his performance and recording career. Bailey then spent the rest of his life running his own shoeshine stand and renting out rooms in his home to make a living. Though he continued to play the harmonica, he almost never performed publicly. One of his rare performances occurred in 1974, when he agreed to appear on the Opry. This was a special event to mark the Opry leaving the Ryman Auditorium for the Grand Ole Opry House. This performance became the impetus for the Opry's annual Old Timers' Shows.

Afterwards Bailey continued to perform at the Opry only occasionally. He played there on his 75th birthday in December 1974, at the Old Timers Shows, and also in April 1982. A few months later that year, in June, he was taken to Nashville's Baptist Hospital in failing health. Bailey died on July 2, 1982, at his daughter's home in Nashville, and is buried in Greenwood Cemetery there.

Influence and posthumous accolades
Bailey himself said that he came from a tradition of "black hillbilly music". His family members had played a variety of instruments, including a grandfather who had been a well-known local fiddler in Smith County, Tennessee. He said later when referring to playing the harmonica when he was growing up "Oh, I wore it out trying to imitate everything I hear! Hens, foxes, hounds, turkeys, and all those trains and things on the road. Everything around me." Along with performing well-known genre classics such as "Cow-Cow Blues", Bailey also wrote his own signature Opry songs, like the train-imitating "Pan American Blues" and the "Dixie Flyer Blues". When WSM's power increased to 50,000 watts, Bailey's influence increased as well, with harmonica enthusiasts listening to his performances and studying his recordings.

In 2005, Nashville Public Television produced the documentary DeFord Bailey: A Legend Lost. The documentary was broadcast nationally through PBS. Bailey was inducted into the Country Music Hall of Fame on November 15, 2005. The DeFord Bailey Tribute Garden at the George Washington Carver Food Park in Nashville was dedicated on June 27, 2007. The Encyclopedia of Country Music called him "the most significant black country star before World War II." Bailey is still being referred to as a "harmonica wizard" more than three decades after his death.

Discography

78 rpm singles
Listing sourced from the University of Santa Barbara Library/American Discography Project's Discography of American Historical Recordings
 "Evening Prayer Blues" / "Alcoholic Blues" (Brunswick, 1927)
 "Muscle Shoal Blues" / "Up Country Blues" (Brunswick, 1927)
 "Dixie Flyer Blues" / "Pan American Blues" (Brunswick, 1927)
 "Fox Chase" / "Old Hen Cackle" (Vocalion, 1928)
 "Ice Water Blues" / "Davidson County Blues" (Victor, 1929)
 "John Henry" / "Like I Want To Be" (split single with Noah Lewis Jug Band) (Victor 23336, 1932)
 "John Henry" / "Chester Blues" (split single with D. H. Bilbro) (Victor 23831, 1933)

Albums
 The Legendary DeFord Bailey (Tennessee Folklore Society, 1998) (recorded 1974–1976)

References

Sources

External links
 Bailey's biographer's site, with audio and photos
 Samples of DeFord Bailey's recordings
 The PBS documentary
 Illustrated DeFord Bailey discography
 The Unsung Black Musician Who Changed Country Music, Narratively, January 23, 2020
 The Encyclopedia of Country Music – Deford Bailey Chapter, Pages 24–25 (David C. Morton)
 
 

1899 births
1982 deaths
African-American guitarists
American country singer-songwriters
American country harmonica players
American country guitarists
American male guitarists
American banjoists
Grand Ole Opry members
Country Music Hall of Fame inductees
Members of the Country Music Association
Singer-songwriters from Tennessee
People from Smith County, Tennessee
African-American country musicians
20th-century African-American male singers
20th-century American guitarists
Guitarists from Tennessee
Country musicians from Tennessee
African-American songwriters
American male singer-songwriters